Gil or GIL may refer to:

Places 
 Gil Island (disambiguation), one of several islands by that name
 Gil, Iran, a village in Hormozgan Province, Iran
 Hil, Azerbaijan, also spelled Gil''', a village in Azerbaijan
 Hiloba, also spelled Gil', a village in Azerbaijan

 People 
Gil (given name)
Gil (surname)
Gil (footballer, born 1950), Brazilian footballer, Gilberto Alves
Gil (footballer, born June 1987), Brazilian footballer, Carlos Gilberto Nascimento Silva
Gil (footballer, born September 1987), Brazilian footballer, José Gildeixon Clemente de Paiva
Gil (footballer, born 1991), Brazilian footballer, Givanilton Martins Ferreira
 José Gildeixon Clemente de Paiva (1987–2016), Brazilian footballer
Gil Gomes (born 1972), Portuguese retired footballer
Gilberto Ribeiro Gonçalves (born 1980), Brazilian footballer
 Gilmelândia (born 1975), Brazilian singer known as "Gil"
 Gill (musician) (born 1977), South Korean singer

 Fiction 
 
 Gil, a non-canon Star Trek Cardassian military rank
 Gil, the currency used in the Final Fantasy games
 Gil, a Bubble Guppies character
 Gil Nexdor, a Johnny Test character.

 Politics 
 Gil (political party) (Pensioners of Israel to the Knesset, Gimla'ey Yisrael LaKnesset), a former Israeli political party later known as Dor
 Independent Liberal Group (Grupo Independiente Liberal in Spanish), a former Spanish political party
 Gioventù Italiana del Littorio (Italian Youth of the Lictor), youth movement of the National Fascist Party of Italy
 Initiative and Liberty Groups'', the initial name for the Initiative and Liberty Movement, a French Gaullist political association

Transport
 Gilgit Airport, IATA code
 Gillingham railway station (Dorset), Dorset, England, National Rail station code

Other uses 
 Tropical Storm Gil (disambiguation), refers to several tropical storms
 Gilbertese language, ISO 639 code
 Generic Image Library, a generic programming library for image processing by Adobe Systems
 Global interpreter lock, in interpreter programs
 Gil (comic strip)

See also
 
 Gill (disambiguation)
 Gilbert (disambiguation)
 Gilberto